Clarence Major (born December 31, 1936) is an American poet, painter, and novelist; winner of the 2015 "Lifetime Achievement Award in the Fine Arts", presented by the Congressional Black Caucus Foundation. He was awarded the 2016 PEN Oakland/Reginald Lockett Lifetime Achievement Award.

Biography 
Clarence Major was born on December 31, 1936, in Atlanta, Georgia, and grew up in Chicago, Illinois. As a teenager he started drawing and painting, writing poetry and fiction.

In his early twenties he started publishing his own literary magazine, Coercion Review, which featured poets and writers such as Henry Miller, Kenneth Patchen and Lawrence Ferlinghetti. As a teenager, Major was influenced by the monumental Van Gogh Exhibition of Paintings and Drawings at the Art Institute of Chicago, February 1 – April 16, 1950.

After a stint in the Air Force, Major left the Midwest and moved to New York City in December 1966. His first novel, All Night Visitors, was published in 1969 and his first collection of poems, Swallow the Lake, the following year. He briefly worked as a research analyst for Simulmatics, under the direction of sociologist Dr. Sol Chaneles. Major analyzed news coverage of the 1960s riots. He also did field work on the riots, in Detroit and Milwaukee, before turning, in 1967, to teaching.

First, he taught in Harlem at the New Lincoln School, in a summer program. He later taught modern American literature courses and creative writing workshops in universities. His first solo exhibition of paintings was at Sarah Lawrence College in the library in the early 1970s. Along with John A. Williams, in 1968, he taught for a stint at Girard College in Philadelphia.

During this time Major was also giving public readings of his poetry. He served on the editorial staff of several literary periodicals (such as Caw! and The Journal of Black Poetry) and wrote a regular column for American Poetry Review. He was the first editor of American Book Review. He read his poetry at the Guggenheim Museum, the Folger Theatre and in universities, theaters and cultural centers.

He joined the Fiction Collective in 1974. Major edited High Plains Literary Review for several years. On a State Department-sponsored trip in 1975 he was a participant at the International Poetry Festival in Struga, Yugoslavia, where he read his work with Leopold Sedar Senghor and other poets from around the world. In 1977, with John Ashbery and other poets from various countries, Major read at the Poetry International in Rotterdam, the Netherlands. Although he had been painting all along, after moving to California in 1989 he showed his paintings more frequently in galleries.

In 1991, Major served as fiction judge for the National Book Awards. In 1987, he served twice on the National Endowment for the Arts Awards panels; and in 1997–98 he served as judge for the PEN/Faulkner Award. He has judged state-sponsored literary contests in Ohio, New York, Washington, Colorado and California.

Major is distinguished professor emeritus of 20th-Century American Literature at the University of California at Davis. His literary archives are in the Givens Collection of African American Literature, Anderson Library of Rare Books and Manuscripts, University of Minnesota, Minneapolis, Minnesota. For the most reliable biographical information on Clarence Major see Contemporary Authors, Volume 337, 2013, pages 270–312, .

Teaching
Major has taught literature and/or creative writing at Brooklyn College, New York University, Queens College, Sarah Lawrence College, University of Washington, Howard University, University of Maryland, University of Colorado, Temple University, Binghamton University, the University of California at Davis and on a Fulbright-Hays Exchange award he taught American culture at the University of Nice, in France, 1981–1983. He left the University of Colorado in 1989 and he taught at the University of California Davis for 18 years before his retirement in 2007.

Recognition
Major won a National Council on the Arts Award for his poetry collection Swallow the Lake in 1970, and the following year was awarded a New York Cultural Foundation grant for poetry. Reflexe et Ossature (1982), the French translation of Reflex and Bone Structure (1975), was nominated for the Prix Maurice Coindreau (1982). Such Was The Season (1987) was a Literary Guild book club selection in 1988. The same year The New York Times Book Review recommended it on its annual "Summer Reading" list. Painted Turtle: Woman With Guitar (1988) was cited by The New York Times Book Review as a "Notable Book of The Year" 1988. In 1990, his short-story collection, Fun & Games, was nominated for the Los Angeles Book Critics Award.

Major won a Bronze Medal as a finalist for the National Book Award in 1999 for Configurations: New and Selected Poems 1958–1998 (Copper Canyon Press). He won the Pushcart Prize for the short story "My Mother and Mitch", in 1989. In 2002 he won the Stephen Henderson Poetry Award for Outstanding Achievement, presented by the African American Literature and Culture Society. His 1986 novel My Amputations won the Western States Book Award and was republished in 2008 with an introduction by Lawrence Hogue. Dirty Bird Blues won the Sister Circle Book Award in 1999.

Major was awarded the International Literary Hall of Fame award (Chicago State University) in 2001. He received the "2015 Lifetime Achievement Award in the Fine Arts" from the Congressional Black Caucus Foundation. He was awarded the 26th annual PEN Oakland/Reginald Lockett Lifetime Achievement Award on December 3, 2016. In January 2017, From Now On: New and Selected Poems was nominated for the 2017 Northern California Book Award sponsored by The Northern California Independent Booksellers Association.

In 2021, Major was inducted into the Georgia Writers Hall of Fame.
 Grant, Struga Yugoslavia International Poetry Festival-U.S. State Department Educational & Cultural Exchange Program, 1975.
 Grant, Fulbright-Hays Inter-University Exchange Award: Franco-American Commission for Educational Exchange—Nice, France, 1981–1983
 Grant, United Kingdom Educational Commission, London, England, 1981.
 Grant, International Communication Agency, American Embassy, London, England, 1982.
 Grant, Commission for Education and Cultural Exchange Between Italy and the U.S. of America, Rome, Italy, 1982.
 Grant, Africa Regional Services, United States International Communication Agency, Paris, France, 1982.
 Grant, IREX (Poland cultural trip), 1984.
 Grant, U.S. Information Service, American Embassy, Paris, France, 1985.

Anthologies
Major has edited several anthologies, most recently Calling the Wind: 20th Century African-American Short Stories (1993) and The Garden Thrives: 20th Century African-American Poetry (1996).

His own work has appeared in the following anthologies: Best American Poetry 2019, The Norton Anthology of American Literature, The Norton Anthology of African-American Literature, Postmodern Poetry in America 1950 to the Present, Men of Our Time: Male Poetry in Contemporary America, Dynamics of Violence, Up Late: American Poetry Since 1970, The World's Best Poetry: Supplement IV, Words On The Page, The World In Your Hands, Mirrors: An Introduction to Literature, The Urban Adventures, American Negro Poetry, Where Is Vietnam: American Poets Respond, In A Time of Revolution: Poems From Our Third World, Poems of War Resistance, A Punishment For Peace, Natural Process: An Anthology of New Black Poetry, Black Out Loud: An Anthology of Modern Poems by Black Americans, Inside Outer Space: New Poems From The Space Age, Soulscript: Afro-American Poetry, The Movement Toward a New America, Dices or Black Bones: Black Voices of The Seventies, Black American Literature 1780–Present, Fine Frenzy: Enduring Themes in Poetry, The Modern Age: Literature, The Real Imagination, You Better Believe It: Black Voices in English, Black Spirits: A Festival of New Black Poets in America, New Black Voices, Starting With Poetry, From The Belly of The Shark, The Poetry of Black America: Anthology of the 20th Century, Open Poetry: Four Anthologies of Expanded Poems, The Liberal Art of Interpretation, A New Rhetoric, The Pushcart Prize: The Best of The Small Presses, Contemporary Writing from The Continents, The Point: Where Teaching and Writing Intersect, The Jazz Poetry Anthology; Giavani Poeti Americani (Italy), Heartshape in the Dust: An Anthology of Black American Poetry (Yugoslavia), American Poets Say Goodbye to the 20th Century, Gondola a Signore Signore Gondola: Venice in 20th Century American Poetry (Italy), Govereci Boben (Poland?), The Writing on The Wall, Merry Christmas Baby, Truth to Power, and others.
Fiction: Children of The Night, American Made, Calling the Wind, The Avant Garde Today: An International Anthology, Statements, Statements 2, The Sound of Writing, Pushcart XV, Breaking Ice, 19 Necromancers From Now, Ten Times Black: Stories From The Black Experience, Not Normal Illinois, American Made, Love Stories and Writing Under Fire: Stories Of The Vietnam War and others.

Periodicals
Major's fiction, poetry, nonfiction and book reviews have appeared in periodicals, among them: The American Scholar, The New Yorker, Harvard Review, The New York Times, The New York Times Book Review, The Washington Post Book World, Los Angeles Times Book Review, The American Poetry Review, The Baffler, Catamaran, Peacock Journal, The Black Scholar, The Baltimore Sun Magazine Supplement, Upstate [Rochester] Sunday Magazine, The Denver Post, Hampton Road Guide and Journal, The Rocky Mountain News, The San Jose Mercury News, Essence, The Massachusetts Review, Chelsea, Ploughshares, Witness, Boulevard, Michigan Quarterly Review, Review of Contemporary Fiction, Trace, Negro Digest, The Nickel Review, [Chicago] Sun-Times Showcase, John O'Hare Journal, American Poetry Review, Kenyon Review, New Myths/MSS, American Review, The Magazine of New Writing, Contact, Folger Poetry Broadside, The Literary Review, Mundus Artium: A Journal of International Literature and the Arts, National Guardian, New York Poetry, The Outsider, Poetry Miscellany, Unmuzzled OX, Yardbird Reader, Works, Callaloo, African American Review, New American Review, Brilliant Corners, A Gathering of The Tribes, Baa Sima (Accra), Black Orpheus (Nigeria), El carno emplumado (Mexico), East and West (India), Fiddlehead (Canada), Gedicht (Antwerp), Interspace (France), In Their Own Words (Italy), New Departures (England), Poetry (England), Pravda (Moscow), Quadrant (Australia), Tautara (Turkey), Vinduet (Norway), and Literatura na Świecie (Poland).

Visual arts
Major studied drawing and painting under the direction of painter Gus Nall (1919–1995) from 1952 to 1954. Major also attended sketch and lecture classes during the same period in Fullerton Hall at the Art Institute of Chicago. Among his teachers there was Addis Osborne (1914–2011).

Major's apprentice artwork was first shown to the public in a group show in the mid-1950s at Gales Gallery on Sixty-Third Street, Chicago. The gallery owner, Mrs. Edna Powell Gale, featured the works of local artists.

Solo exhibitions of his work have been held at Pierre Menard Gallery, Harvard Square, Cambridge, University Art Gallery Indiana State University, Terre Haute, Sarah Lawrence College, Kresge Art Museum, East Lansing, Michigan, Hamilton Club Gallery, Paterson, New Jersey, Phoenix Gallery, Sacramento CA, Exploding Head Gallery, Sacramento CA, Blue Hills Gallery, Winters, CA, Main Street Gallery, Winters CA, and many other venues.

His artwork is in many private collections as well as in several public one: Indiana State University, Terre Haute; Passaic County Community College Permanent Collection of Contemporary Art; the Schacknow Museum of Fine Art, Plantation, Florida; and The Linda Matthews MARBL Collection at Emory University, Atlanta, Georgia.

His paintings have appeared in many group shows at such galleries as John Natsoulas Gallery (Davis, CA), University of Rochester Art Gallery (Rochester, New York), Denenberg Fine Arts Gallery, Los Angeles, Anita Shapolsky Gallery (New York, New York), 40 Acres Gallery (Sacramento, CA), Main Street Gallery (Winters, CA), Nelson Gallery, University of California at Davis.

Many of his paintings have appeared on covers of his own books, among them Myself Painting, Waiting for Sweet Betty, and Down and Up, three poetry collections. His 1979 novel Emergency Exit contains reproductions of his paintings and his essay collection, Necessary Distance, is illustrated with his drawings. A book on his art and literature, Clarence Major and His Art: Portraits of an African-American Postmodernist by Bernard Bell, appeared in 1998. Conversations with Clarence Major by Nancy Bunge was published in 2002. While focused largely on literature, both books contain Major's views on painting.

Exhibition catalogs: Black: A Celebration of African American Art in Sacramento-Area Collections, 2008; Configurations, paintings by Clarence Major, Pierre Menard Gallery, Harvard Square, Cambridge, MA, 2010; Myself Painting, paintings by Clarence Major, University Gallery, The Center for Performing Arts, Indiana State University, Terre Haute, Indiana, 2011; The Writers' Brush: An Exhibition of Art Work by Writers by Donald Friedman and John Wronoski, Introduction by Joseph McElroy, New York: Anita Shapolsky Art Foundation, 2014.

Major curated the exhibition of paintings Spirit Made Visible, containing the works of Robert Colescott, John Abduljaami, Mike Henderson, Oliver Jackson, Mary Lovelace O'Neal, Joe Overstreet, Raymond Saunders, and others, as well by Major himself, at the John Natsoulas Gallery, Davis, California, May 9–31, 1992.

Exhibitions
 Sarah Lawrence College Library, Spring 1974
 First National Bank Gallery, Boulder, January 3–17, 1986
 Kresge Art Museum, East Lansing, Michigan, September 4 – October 28, 2001
 Schacknow Museum of Fine Art, Plantation, Florida, April–May 2003
 Exploding Head Gallery, Sacramento, CA, April 2003, August 2004, July 2006
 Hamilton Club Gallery Paterson New Jersey, November 4 – February 28, 2007
 John Natsoulas Gallery, May 9 – 31, 1992, June 2002, July 1993
 Porter-Troupe Gallery, San Diego, CA, April 2001
 Blue Hills Gallery, Winters, CA, April–June 2005
 The Phoenix Gallery, Sacramento, March 2006, July 2006
 California Historical Society Museum, San Francisco, December 11, 2004 – April 16, 2005
 Pierre Menard Gallery, Harvard Square, Cambridge MA, August 6 – September 3, 2010
 University Gallery Indiana State University, Terre Haute, February 2011

Teaching 

 Teaching Areas of Specialization: Modern and Contemporary Literature in English; African-American Literature; Creative Writing in Poetry; Creative writing in Fiction.
 Creative Writing Instructor, The New Lincoln (Summer) School, Harlem, 1967
 Creative Writing Instructor, Girard College, Philadelphia, 1968 
 Adjunct Instructor, Brooklyn College, CCUNY, 1968–1969, 1973, 1974–1975
 Adjunct Instructor New York University (night school), 1971
 Adjunct Instructor, Queens College, CCUNY, 1972–1973
 Adjunct Instructor, Sarah Lawrence College, 1972–1975
 Assistant Professor, Howard University, Washington D. C., 1974–1976
 Visiting Creative Writer, University of Maryland, College Park, 1975
 Assistant Professor, University of Washington, Seattle, Washington, 1976–1977
 Associate Professor, University of Colorado, Boulder, Colorado, 1977–1981
 Professor, University of Colorado, Boulder, Colorado, 1981–1989  
 Professor, University of California, Davis, 1989–2003
 Distinguished Professor, University of California, 2003–2017
 University of California, San Diego, California, 1981
 University of Nice, France, 1981–1983
 State University of New York Binghamton, 1988
 Temple University, Philadelphia, 1988
 Other academic and writing appointments: Warren Wilson College; Clayton College, Denver; Albany State College, Albany, Georgia; Wisconsin State University, Eau Claire; Cazenovia College, New York; Squaw Valley Community of Writers

Education 
Major has attended or received degrees from the following institutions:
 The Art Institute of Chicago (James Nelson Raymond scholar), 1952–54.
 Gus Nall Studio, Private Art Lessons, 1950–1954.
 The New School for Social Research (French course only), 1971.
 Norwalk Community College, Norwalk Connecticut, 1972.
 Howard University, Washington D.C., 1974–1975. 
 State University of New York, Albany, B.S. 1976.
 Union Institute and University, Yellow Springs and Cincinnati, Ohio, Ph.D. 1978.

Bibliography 
Novels
 All-Night Visitors, Northeastern University Press (1969, 1998), 
 No, Emerson Hall (1973), 
 Reflex and Bone Structure (1975, 1996), ; 
 Emergency Exit (1979), 
 My Amputations (1986, 2008), 
 Such Was The Season (1987, 2003), 
 Painted Turtle: Woman With Guitar (1988, 2015), 
 Dirty Bird Blues, Berkley Publishing Group (1996, 1997), ; 
 One Flesh, Kensington (2003), 
 The Lurking Place, Manic D Press (2021), 
 Thunderclouds in the Forecast, Northwestern University Press (2021), 
 Dirty Bird Blues (2023), Penguin Classics, 

Short stories
 Fun & Games (1990), ; 
 Chicago Heat and Other Stories (2016), 

Poetry
 Swallow The Lake (1970), 
 Symptoms & Madness (1971), 
 Private Line (1971), Library of Congress card No. 76-160609
 The Cotton Club (1972), 
 The Syncopated Cakewalk (1974), 
 Inside Diameter: The France Poems (1985), 
 Surfaces and Masks (1988), 
 Some Observations of a Stranger at Zuni in The Latter Part of The Century (1989), 
 Parking Lots (1992), Perishable Press limited edition handset type
 Configurations: New and Selected Poems 1958–1998, Copper Canyon Press (1998), 
 Waiting for Sweet Betty, Copper Canyon Press (2002), 
 Myself Painting, LSU Press (2008), 
 Down and Up (2013), ; 
 From Now On: New and Selected Poems 1970–2015 (2015), 
 My Studio, LSU Press (2018), 
 Sporadic Troubleshooting (2022), 

Nonfiction
 Dictionary of Afro-American Slang (1970),  Library of Congress Card Number 79-130863
 Black Slang: A Dictionary of Afro-American Talk, London: Routledge (1971),  
 The Dark and Feeling: Black American Writers and Their Work, Okpaku Communications Corp (1974), 
 Juba to Jive: A Dictionary of African-American Slang (1994), 
 Necessary Distance: Essays and Criticism (2000), 
 Come by Here: My Mother's Life, Wiley (2002), 
 Configurations Paintings by Clarence Major (2010), limited edition exhibition catalogue
 Myself Painting Paintings by Clarence Major (2011), limited edition exhibition catalogue
 Clarence Major and His Art: Portraits of an African-American Postmodernist, ed. Bernard W. Bell (2001), 
 The Paintings and Drawings of Clarence Major (2019), 

Anthologies
 The New Black Poetry (1969), 
 Calling The Wind: 20th Century African-American Short Stories, HarperCollins (1993), 
 The Garden Thrives: 20th Century African-American Poetry, HarperCollins (1996), 
 The Essential Clarence Major (2020),

References

Biographical, critical, and professional information on Clarence Major 
 Byerman, Keith E., The Art and Life of Clarence Major, University of Georgia Press, 2012, 
 Bell, Bernard W. (ed.), Clarence Major and His Art: Portraits of an African-American Postmodernist, University of North Carolina Press, 2001, 
 Bunge, Nancy (ed.), Conversations with Clarence Major, University Press of Mississippi, 2002, 
 Dickson-Carr, Darryl, The Columbia Guide To Contemporary African American Fiction, 2005, 
 Contemporary Authors Volume 337, 2013; ; revised and extended autobiographical essay, pp. 270–312
 Contemporary Authors Volume 21–24R
 Contemporary Authors Autobiographical Series volume 6
 Contemporary Authors New Revision Series, volumes 13, 25, 53, 82
 Contemporary Literary Criticism, volumes 3, 19, 48
 Contemporary Novelists (St. James Press/ Gale), 4, 5, 6, 7
 Contemporary Poets (St. James Press/ Gale), edition 5
 Mystery and Suspense Writers (Charles Scribner's Sons/ Gale)
 Black Writers 2, 3
 Black Literature Criticism, edition 1:2
 Benet's Reader's Encyclopedia of American Literature, first edition, HarperCollins (1991)
 Being and Race by Charles Johnson (Indiana University Press, 1990), 
 Black Male Fiction and the Legacy of Caliban by James W. Coleman (University of Kentucky Press, 2001)
 Black American Writers Past and Present (1975)
 Black Imagination and The Middle Passage edited by Maria Diedrich et al., Oxford, 
 Broadside Authors and Artists (1974)
 Contemporary African-American Novelists (Greenwood, 1999)
 Contemporary Black Biography (Gale, 1995)
 Clark, Keith, Contemporary Black Men's Fiction and Drama (Indiana, 2001), 
 Cyclopedia of World Authors. Third edition, Volume 5 (Salem Press, 1997)
 Mackey, Nathanial, Discrepant Engagement: Dissonance, Cross-Culturality, and Experimental Writing (Cambridge)
 Dictionary of Literary Biography Volume 33 (Gale, 1984)
 African American National Biography (2012)
 Africana: The Encyclopedia of the African and African American Experience, Second Edition
 A Directory of American Poets (ongoing)
 Fabre, Michel, and John A. Williams, A Street Guide to African-Americans in Paris (Afram, 1996)
 Directory of American Scholars (1982, 1999, 2002)
 Encyclopedia of American Literature (1999)
 Encyclopedia of World Literature in the 20th Century (Third edition St. James Press, 1999)
 Finkenstaedt, Rose L. H., Face to Face (Morrow)
 Fabre, Michel, From Harlem to Paris (University of Illinois Press, 1991)
 Byerman, Keith, Fingering the Jagged Grain (University of Georgia Press)
 In Black and White: A Guide to Magazine Articles, Newspaper Articles, and books etc. (Third edition 1980)
 The International Who's Who (ongoing)
 Brennan, Jonathan, When Brer Rabbit Meets Coyote: African-Native American Literature (University of Illinois Press, 2003), 
 Who's Who in the World 29th Edition 2012
 Who's Who in America (ongoing)
 Who's Who Among African Americans (ongoing)
 Who's Who Among Black Americans (ongoing)
 Who's Who in U. S. (1988)
 Who's Who in the Media and Communications (1997)
 Who's Who in the West (Marquis/ ongoing)
 Who's Who in Writers, Editors and Poets (1992)
 Who's Who in Entertainment
 International Who's Who in Poetry (ongoing)
 People Weekly February 7, 1994, Volume 41, Number 5
 Fabre, Michel, La Rive Noire (Lieu Commun)
 Larousse Dictionary of Writers
 The Lincoln Library of Language Arts (Frontier Press, 1978)
 Salzman, Jack, Major Characters in American Fiction (A Henry Holt Reference Book, 1994), 
 Magill, Frank N., Masterpieces of African-American Literature (HarperCollins)
 Modern American Literature (Fifth edition 1999)
 Murry, Rolland, Our Living Manhood (Penn)
 The Negro Almanac (ongoing)
 Bell, Bernard, The Afro-American Novel and its Tradition (U Mass)
 Bell, Bernard, The Contemporary African American Novel (U Mass)
 King, L., and L. F. Selzer (eds), New Essays on The African American Novel (2008)
 Cornis-Pope, Marcel, Narrative Innovation and Cultural Rewriting in the Cold War Era and After
 The Oxford Companion to African American Literature (Oxford University Press, 1997)
 The Concise Oxford Companion to African American Literature
 The Oxford Companion to Twentieth-Century Literature in English (Oxford University Press, 1996)
 Valade, R. M., The Essential Black Literature Guide (Visible Ink)
 The Schomburg Center Guide to Black Literature (Gale, 1996)
 Selected Black American, African, and Caribbean Authors (1985)
 Selected Black American Authors (1977)
 Seems Like Murder by Adam Gussow (University of Chicago Press)
 Southern Black Creative Writers 1829–1953 (Greenwood Press, 1988)
 McCaffery, Larry, Some Other Frequency (University of Pennsylvania Press)
 The Writers Directory (ongoing)
 The Poet's Encyclopedia
 Collier's Encyclopedia
 Jimoh, Yemisi, Spiritual, Blues, and Jazz People in African-American Fiction (University of Tenn Press)
 Klinkowitz, Jerome, The Practice of Fiction in America
 Klinkowitz, Jerome, and Roy Behrens, The Life of Fiction (University of Illinois Press)
 JKlinkowtz, Jerome, Literary Disruptions (University of Illinois Press)
 Klinkowitz, Jerome, Keeping Literary Company (SUNY)
 Hathaway, Heather, Josef Jarab, and Jeffrey Melnick, Race and the Modern Artist (Oxford University Press, 2003)
 Smith, M. W., Reading Simulacra: Fatal Theories for Postmodernity (State University of New York Press, 2001), 
 Soitoes, Stephens F., The Blues Detective: A Study of African-American Detective Fiction, University of Massachusetts Press, 1996, 
 Platt, Len, and Lee Upstone, Postmodern Literature and Race. New York and London: Cambridge University Press, 
 Reed, Anthony, Freedom Time: The Poetics and Politics of Black Experimental Writing (the Callaloo African Diaspora Series), 
 Mullen, Harryette, and Hank Lazer, Cracks Between What We Are and What We Are Supposed To Be: Essays and Interviews, August 6, 2012
 Newton, Keith, The Columbia Granger Index to Collected Works. New York and London: Columbia, 
 Smetherst, James Edward, The Black Arts Movement: Literary Nationalism in the 1960s and 1970s, 2005, 
 Levine, Caroline, Forms: Whole, Rhythm, Hierarchy... (Princeton: Princeton University Press, 2015),

External links 
 
 
 
 
  in the Givens Collection, Anderson Library, University of Minnesota

Living people
1936 births
20th-century African-American painters
20th-century African-American writers
20th-century American male artists
20th-century American male writers
20th-century American novelists
20th-century American painters
20th-century American poets
21st-century African-American artists
21st-century African-American writers
21st-century American essayists
21st-century American male artists
21st-century American male writers
21st-century American novelists
21st-century American painters
21st-century American poets
American male novelists
American male painters
American male poets
Anthologists
Binghamton University faculty
Brooklyn College faculty
Novelists from New York (state)
Painters from California
University of California, Davis faculty
Writers from California